Kaknäs is a former village in Medieval times located in Stockholm, Sweden, as part of the Ladugårdsgärdet area. It is the site of several archeological finds and has given its name to Kaknästornet. During the 1912 Summer Olympics, it hosted several shooting events.

The shooting part of the modern pentathlon competition also took place here.

See also
Kaknästornet

References
 1912 Summer Olympics official report. pp. 222–4.

Venues of the 1912 Summer Olympics
Olympic modern pentathlon venues
Sports venues in Stockholm